44 & 66 is an album by folk singer/guitarist Greg Brown. It was released in 1980 on Rose Alley Records. It was re-issued in 1984 on Red House Records, the second release by the newly formed label.

Reception

Writing for Allmusic, music critic Jeff Schwachter wrote the album "is a moodier album than Iowa Waltz, and Brown's songwriting takes a sharper turn into wider topical spaces and shows traces of the talents that would become developed to a fuller extent on his following release... This is an early album from one of the most enduring careers in contemporary songwriting and should not be overlooked."

Track listing

Personnel
 Greg Brown – vocals, guitar
 Chuck Henderson – guitar
 Dave Moore – harmonica
 Ron Rohovit – bass
 Al Soucek – clarinet
 Prudence Johnson – background vocals
 Gary Delaney – mandolin

Production
 Produced by Greg Brown. (Original Producers Wayne Glover And Dennis Jones.)
 Engineered and mixed by Tom Tucker
 Photography by Dom Franco and Steve Zardony
 Layout Design by James Ochs

References

Greg Brown (folk musician) albums
1980 albums